Ascope is a province in the La Libertad Region, Peru. It is bordered by the Trujillo Province on the south; the Pacasmayo Province on the north; the Cajamarcan province of Contumazá and the Otuzco and Gran Chimú provinces on the east; and the Pacific Ocean on the west. Its capital is Ascope.

Political division
The province is divided into eight districts (singular: distrito), each of which is headed by a mayor (alcalde):

Some localities
Santiago de Cao
Sausal
Roma
Chiclín
Chiquitoy
Santa Clara
San José

See also
Paiján culture
Trujillo Province
Chicama Valley
Moche Valley

Provinces of the La Libertad Region